Vakhtang III (1276–1308), of the dynasty of Bagrationi, was the king of Georgia from 1302 to 1308. He ruled during the Mongol dominance of Georgia.

A son of Demetrius II of Georgia by his Trapezuntine wife, Vakhtang was appointed, in 1302, by the Ilkhan Ghazan as a rival king to his brother David VIII, who had revolted against the Mongol rule. Vakhtang, however, controlled only the Georgian capital of Tbilisi and parts of the southern and eastern provinces of the kingdom. After an unsuccessful offensive against David's guerrillas, the brothers agreed to rule the kingdom jointly. However, Vakhtang was destined to spend most of his reign as a commander of the Georgian and Armenian auxiliaries in endless Mongol campaigns, particularly against Damascus (1303) and Gilan (1304).

Family

Vakhtang III married Ripsime. The 18th-century Georgian Chronicle mentions her as a niece of Shabur. They had two known sons:

Demetre, ruler of Dmanisi.
Giorgi, ruler of Samshvilde.

Ancestry

References

Ivane Javakhishvili. History of the Georgian nation. v. 3; Tbilisi, 1982: 147-150 (in Georgian)

1276 births
1308 deaths
13th-century people from Georgia (country)
14th-century people from Georgia (country)
Bagrationi dynasty of the Kingdom of Georgia
Kings of Georgia
Eastern Orthodox monarchs